Flesh & Blood is a trading card game published by Legend Story Studios (LSS), an independent design studio based in Auckland, New Zealand. The core mission of Legend Story Studios is "to bring people together in the flesh and blood through the common language of playing great games."   LSS intends to create value for Local Game Stores, so they may continue to support this core mission in their stores for generations to come. The emphasis on in-person play counters the trend of online CCGs by bringing players back to a table seated across from their opponent.

History

Prior to First Booster Set Release 
Flesh and Blood began development seven years before its official release, well before the studio was officially founded or the game had a name. In December 2018, when the game was officially announced for the first time, Legend Story Studios was a team of six operating out of a studio apartment. On August 31, 2019, 120 players gathered for the Ira World Premiere event at a game store in Auckland, New Zealand. The event was played with Ira Welcome Decks. The Ira Welcome Deck was specifically designed to be a new player's first play experience and continues to be used in game stores to teach new players the basics of Flesh & Blood.

First Booster Set Release 
On October 11, 2019, Legend Story Studios released the first booster set of Flesh & Blood, Welcome to Rathe, in stores across the United States, Australia, and New Zealand. Welcome to Rathe was distributed direct from the studio to local game stores, with a team that, at the time, consisted of just seven employees. Taking place on October 27, The Calling: Auckland was the first premier event in Flesh and Blood history.

2020 and COVID-19 
As the release date for Flesh & Blood's second booster product, Arcane Rising, approached, the studio's home country of New Zealand officially went into lockdown due to the COVID-19 Pandemic. LSS navigated the first year of the pandemic by:

 Publishing an open letter to the FAB community, openly sharing their plans for the future.
 Re-writing their Organized Play policies to support players playing from home and over webcam
 Fast-tracking the introduction of Play Anywhere!, allowing players to play games at home with the official FAB tournament software GEM.
 Creating Skirmish, a new tournament series designed to provide players with a meaningful and accessible step up from weekly Armory Events in geographies where in-person play was allowed. Two full Skirmish seasons were completely enabled through webcam play, with LSS shipping out prizes all over the world from their studio in Auckland.

Crucible of War was officially released on August 28, accompanied by the announcement of Welcome to Rathe and Arcane Rising Unlimited. As the player base was beginning to rapidly grow, the Alpha and First Edition boxes that had been widely available for almost a year were suddenly selling out, and Unlimited would allow more people to get their hands on the sets for months to come.

In October 2020, LSS announced European and Canadian distribution

October 20, 2020: LSS announces an official content partnership with world leading Trading Card Game website ChannelFireball.com.

October 28, 2020: LSS announces Flesh and Blood will be available on TCGplayer.com, the worlds leading marketplace for TCG sealed product and single cards.

2021 and Beyond 
July 6, 2021: LSS announces FAB is sold in games stores in over 30 countries and the manufacturing of the product will expand to be printed in three countries: Japan, Belgium, United States

August 3, 2021: LSS reveals plans for the 2022 competitive season, including US$1,000,000 in prize support.

August 10, 2021: LSS announces distribution in South East Asia

August 20, 2021: LSS celebrates the 2,000th store signing up to stock FAB and summarizes the full impact the pandemic had on their game and their business

September 10, 2021: The return of major competitive events would make their way to Las Vegas, United States for the first time since the Calling: Austin in December 2019.

November 2021: LSS announces Everfest will be the world's first full production trading card game product featuring fully recyclable paper booster wrappers

December 2021: National Champions are crowned in 24 different countries during National Championships season.

January 10, 2022:  LSS announces Flesh and Blood is now available on cardmarket.com, Europe's largest online marketplace for TCG sealed product and single cards.

April 12, 2022: LSS announces "FAB2.0", sharing plans to retire 1st edition, print cards in localized languages (French, German, Italian, and Spanish), emphasize non-competitive play formats, and more.

June 20, 2022:  LSS announces dates and distribution partners for European Language products.

July 21, 2022:  LSS announces partnership with Premier Card Grading (PCG), ensuring Flesh and Blood's coveted prize cards truly are the gold standard.  All Gold Cold Foil prize cards going forward will be PCG raw grade authenticated 9 or better. Calling champion prize cards and Pro Tour champion prize cards will be fully graded and slabbed at PCG 9.5 or better.

September 12, 2022: LSS announces Flesh and Blood is coming to Brazil

September 22, 2022: US Patent Office issues  to James White as inventor of an apparatus and method of playing a card game.

September 2022: National Champions are crowned in 39 different countries during National Championships season.

October 2022: LSS celebrates the three year anniversary of Flesh and Blood.  The game is actively played in more than 3,000 stores throughout 38 countries.

November 4–6, 2022: The first World Championship takes place in San Jose, California. During the event, LSS announces two new collaborations.  The first is with Tolarian Community College and will yield a new product to be released in 2023. The second is a collaboration with Weta Workshop which will produce limited edition Prism hero statues.

Reception

Critical Reviews 
January 11, 2020: "Fast Paced. Exciting. And downright tactical!"  From There Will Be Games

October 19, 2020: "Flesh and Blood is designed to challenge the established rules of TCGs like never before" From Channel Fireball, Luis Scott-Vargas

December 18, 2020: "Why Flesh and Blood Is A Must-Play Trading Card Game" From Den of Geek

April 17, 2021: "Flesh and Blood TCG is Your New Card Game Addiction" By Drew Cordell

July 9, 2021: "The most strategic CCG since Magic with a much smaller learning curve" From Board Game Quest

October 8, 2021: ICv2 says Flesh & Blood is gaining steam in the collectors market and is on the brink of a full-on break out reminiscent of the explosive growth that Magic: The Gathering sets initially experienced in the early days of TCGs

2021: ICv2 shares trends to show Flesh and Blood has entered the top 5 collectible games

November 11, 2022: "Flesh and Blood, MTG’s upstart competitor, has found strength in community" From Polygon / Vox Media

Awards 
2022: Legend Story Studios tops the Deloitte Fast 50 index as New Zealand's fastest-growing business with a growth rate of 6415% which is unmatched by any previous Fast 50 winner.

2022: Best Trading Card Game (Uprising). Awarded by Tabletop Gaming

2022: Best Ongoing Card Game (Everfest). Awarded by Dicebreaker

Outreach 
LSS raises $75,000 during The Calling: Krakow to support Ukrainian refugees affected by the 2022 Russian invasion of Ukraine

LSS and Flesh & Blood players raise $50,000 for St. Jude Children's Hospital

In partnership with TCGPlayer, LSS awards $75,000 to Local Game Stores through the sale of Monarch bundles. $100,000 to Local Game Stores through the sale of Tales of Aria bundles. $100,000 to Local Game Stores through the sale of Everfest bundles.

Product Releases

Booster Sets 
Booster packs contain randomized cards.  First Edition cards are generally more desirable to collectors than Unlimited cards from the same set. Cold Foil card treatments do not appear in Unlimited sets.

Super Rares were discontinued after Arcane Rising.

Starting with Uprising, there is no differentiation between First Edition and Unlimited Cold Foil versions of cards found in the Token slot of a booster pack cannot be played in Draft if opened.

Starting in Uprising, high tier alt versions of cards can be found in booster packs. These cards are referred to as "Marvels" and have a new rarity symbol represented by a purple triangle. All cards with the marvel rarity symbol are much rarer than a normal foil version of their base rarity would be. This table lists the number of Marvels for each rarity. For example, there are 51 Majestic rarity cards in Dynasty.  Of those 51 Majestics, 9 have a Marvel version available and 42 do not.

Pre-Constructed Deck Products 
Pre-con blitz decks and hero decks are not randomized. They are designed to be ready-to-play against each other direct from the packaging.

Card Rarity Symbols 
All Flesh and Blood cards have a rarity. Symbols indicating card rarity have changed slightly between WTR Alpha and EVR. Rarity symbols haven't changed from EVR and subsequent sets.

ARC Unlimited Eye of Ophidia has the fabled symbol missing.

Marvel cards have a purple triangle rarity symbol replacing the base rarity symbol.

Promotional cards have a green circle rarity symbol or "-P" after the card number

Heroes of FAB

Adult Heroes

Young Heroes

Gameplay Formats and Deck Construction

Overview 

 Welcome Page (Learn to Play for Beginners)
 Comprehensive Rules (For experienced players)

In a game of Flesh and Blood, each player's deck is centered around their chosen Hero card. Hero cards have a Class and/or Talent, and all cards in a player's deck must match either the Hero's Class or Talent, or else be Generic cards available to all Heroes. Players also choose a Weapon (or two "one-hand" weapons) and up to four equipment pieces, all of which are revealed and start the game in play. Players shuffle their decks and draw the number of cards equal to their Hero's intellect. Each hero has a starting life total, and the object of the game is to reduce your opponent's life to zero through attacks. After start of game procedures, the "turn player" begins their turn. Turns are alternated between players until the game is over.

On their turn, a player may attack using cards from their hand or arsenal, or activate abilities on cards already in play. Doing so consumes an action point, and players may gain more action points through various effects. After an attack, the defending player can defend with equipment or cards from their hand, then there is a reaction phase in which both players may play instants or additional attack or defense reaction cards to try to alter the outcome of the combat. After the reaction phase, if the attack power exceeds the defense value, the difference is dealt to the enemy hero's life total. A player may attack or play additional actions as long as they have action points. Flesh and Blood's resource system allows cards from a player's hand to be played, pitched to pay the cost of a played card, or sacrificed to defend against an opponent's attack.  This enables players to use their most powerful cards early in the game if desired, rather than gradually ramping up as in other TCGs. The lack of dedicated "energy" or "land" cards also reduces the randomness of each game, by preventing situations where a player draws too many or too few energy cards. At the end of their turn, played and defending cards go to graveyard, pitched cards are returned to the bottom of a player's deck in an order chosen by the player, then the turn player draws cards to match their hero's Intellect, and play passes to the opponent.

Card Legality 

List of Banned and Suspended Cards
 Living Legend Leaderboards

Flesh and Blood uses a revolving card legality model where cards flow in and out of being legal for tournament play based on the mix of heroes that are legal at any one time.  A tournament legal constructed deck may only include generic cards and cards that share the same class and/or talent as the hero card used. Therefore, it's hero cards which ultimately determine the tournament legality of all non-generic cards that exist in Flesh and Blood.  The Living Legend system is Flesh and Blood's approach to managing rotation. It is intended to ensure a dynamic long term metagame while respecting the investment that players have made in their collections of competitive cards.  A hero stops being legal when it has attained Living Legend status. When a hero attains Living Legend status, so does their signature weapon.

Classic Constructed 

 Classic Constructed Rules & Procedures

Flesh and Blood supports two Constructed formats, with slightly different deckbuilding rules. In Classic Constructed, which is used for most high-level tournament play, each player chooses a Hero card and up to 80 additional cards. After the players reveal their chosen hero, players select the weapons, equipment, and at least 60 non-weapon non-equipment cards to serve as their deck. The 80 card limit allows players to balance between bringing more weapon and equipment options to start the game with, or to bring more cards of other types to modify their deck. Once both players have made these choices, they shuffle their decks, reveal their weapons and equipment, and draw starting hands. In Classic Constructed, players may not bring more than three copies of any unique card. Card uniqueness is defined by the card's name and pitch cost together – the same card may be printed with up to three different pitch costs, signified by a color bar (red, yellow, or blue) at the top of the card, players may bring three copies of each pitch cost version, for a total of nine copies, if they wish. Legendary cards are limited to one copy. All cards in a player's deck must share a Class or Talent with the Hero card, or be Generic cards. Classic Constructed is generally played with a 50-minute time limit, using a single-game match.

Blitz 

 Blitz Gameplay Rules & Procedures

The Blitz format is a faster version of the constructed format. Blitz allows only a subset of hero cards, called Young Heroes. Players start with a deck of exactly 40 cards, and may not bring any additional cards to modify it. However, players are still permitted to bring up to 11 inventory cards (weapons and equipment) to choose from after seeing the opponent's chosen Hero. Decks are limited to two copies of each unique card, using the same rules as above. Games are generally played with a 30-minute time limit, and single-game matches.

Commoner 

 Commoner Rules & Procedures

Commoner is a fun, low barrier to entry way to play Flesh and Blood. It's a great constructed format for social gaming. A typical game of Commoner lasts around 20 minutes. Commoner decks can only include Common cards.

Ultimate Pit Fight 

 Ultimate Pit Fight Rules & Procedures

Flesh and Blood also supports a multiplayer constructed format called Ultimate Pit Fight. It uses a hybrid version of the above deck construction rules, with 60 card decks, 20 card inventories, and with young heroes recommended. Players only attack the players seated directly to their sides, and only defend themselves. This format is not intended for tournament play.

Limited (Sealed Deck and Booster Draft) 

 Booster Draft Rules & Procedures
 Sealed Deck Rules & Procedures

There are two limited formats for Flesh and Blood, where players build a deck using cards obtained at the event. The main difference is how the players' registered deck is formed. In Sealed, players open six booster packs, and all cards in those packs become their card pool. In Draft, players choose cards one at a time from a booster pack, and then pass the remaining cards around the table to be drafted, continuing until 3 packs have been opened for each player at the table. In both cases, players only need to build their deck using cards from their limited pools. They may choose any number of Young Hero and Weapon cards from the set being used for the event, and a sufficient number of such cards will generally be provided by the tournament organizer. If deck registration is required, players must choose a hero at the time of deck construction and use that hero throughout the tournament, otherwise, players may change heroes between rounds. Players may use Equipment cards, but must have those cards in their card pool. There is no restriction on using multiple copies of the same card, except that Legendary cards are still limited to one copy. At each match, players reveal their hero, then choose weapons, equipment, and a deck of at least 30 cards. Due to the rules about cards matching the Hero's Class or Talent, players may occasionally not have enough cards to build a legal 30 card deck. In this case, players are permitted to add token cards named Cracked Bauble, which have no use except to be pitched to provide two resource points. Rounds are played with single game matches and a 30-minute time limit.

Organized Play 

 Organized Play Pathway
 2022 Organized Play Announcement
 2023 Organized Play Announcement

Competitive play in Flesh & Blood follows the Organized Play Pathway.  There were 935,000+ matches of Flesh and Blood played across all official Organized Play tournaments in 2022. Legend Story Studios awards over US$1,000,000 annually in tournament prize money.  Tournaments are structured into four tiers:

Professional Tournament Invitations (PTIs) do not expire and can be accumulated. PTIs can also be gifted between players.

Tier 3 & 4 events are weekend-long conventions, with a multi-day main event as well as competitive and casual side events in a variety of formats. There are also artists, vendors, special guest appearances and a cosplay contest.

Tier 1 & 2 events start and finish in one day.

On-Demand, Welcome Deck and Play Anywhere events can be organized by any player and are not part of the OP Pathway.

Pro Tour History

World Championship History

Calling History 

Limited events use Sealed Deck rules for the initial Swiss rounds, and then cut, followed by two Swiss Drafts (6 rounds in total), followed by a cut to the Top 8 Draft. Currently, the cut is to Top 64 before the first Swiss Draft, with a second cut to Top 32 before the second Swiss Draft.

Classic Constructed events use Swiss pairings. Blitz events use Swiss+3, three rounds above the normal number of swiss rounds based on the number of players.

Tournament structure 
 Tournament Rules and Policy (For official Organized Play events)

Tournaments are played using a number of rounds based on the total number of entrants, using the swiss pairings system. Tournaments may award prizes based on record, or may also include a Top 4 or Top 8 playoff. Sealed events generally use a Top 8 draft, other tournaments will use the same format for the swiss and playoff rounds. In the playoff rounds, draws are not possible, and if time controls are being used, an end of match procedure determines the winner of the match, using life totals and continuing play under sudden death rules if life totals are tied.

To mitigate the risk of bribery and match fixing, especially towards the end of a high-level tournament, Flesh and Blood tournament rules prohibit asking for a concession once a match has begun, and award no points for a draw. Players are permitted to concede, but will be dropped from the tournament unless a judge is called and finds a "genuine reason" for them to need to concede, such as feeling unwell or having no plausible way to win the game. Tournament rules also prohibit note-taking, largely due to the "pitch" mechanic, where cards are placed on the bottom of each player's deck in an order chosen by the player. Allowing players to track this order would be excessively time-consuming.

References

External links
 Flesh & Blood Official website

Collectible card games
Card games introduced in 2019